The 2003 Penn Quakers football team represented the University of Pennsylvania in the 2003 NCAA Division I-AA football season. The Quakers finished the season undefeated and won the Ivy League championship, their second league title in a row and third of past four years.

Schedule

References

Penn
Penn Quakers football seasons
Ivy League football champion seasons
College football undefeated seasons
Penn Quakers football